Lekenik is a village and a municipality in central Croatia, located between Sisak and Velika Gorica in the lowland region of Turopolje. 

Norman Jewison chose Lekenik to represent Anatevka for the 1971 film Fiddler on the Roof, after visiting other sites in Austria, Canada, and Romania. The film ends with the credit: "Our thanks to the people of the villages of Lekenik and Mala Gorica and the city of Zagreb, Yugoslavia."

Population 
The population of Lekenik is 1,857, with 6,170 people in the municipality, notably in larger villages like Pešćenica (915), Letovanić (539), Donji Vukojevac (468), and Dužica (395). It is known by SOS Children village, larger than village in Ladimirevci; two of them in Croatia. Absolute majority are Croats at 97%.

Media 
RTL Radio—Local radio station.

References 

Populated places in Sisak-Moslavina County
Municipalities of Croatia